Patrick Joseph O'Brien (1835 – 10 January 1911) was Irish Nationalist Member of Parliament for North Tipperary, 1885–1906.

He was the only son of James O'Brien of Nenagh, County Tipperary and of Bridget, daughter of John Gunning Regan. He was educated at local schools and became a hotel proprietor. In 1878 he married Bridget, daughter of Denis Hayes of Ballintoher, Nenagh. He was chairman of the Nenagh Town Commissioners, 1880–87 and 1890–91, and first Catholic Chairman of the Nenagh Board of Guardians, 1885–99. In 1882 he was arrested as a suspect and confined in Naas gaol. Later he was a County Councillor, and Chairman of the District Council, 1899–1900.

He was elected to represent the new seat of North Tipperary, in which Nenagh was situated, in 1885, defeating the Conservative candidate by a margin of 19 to one. He was then returned unopposed in 1886. When the Irish Parliamentary Party split over the leadership of Charles Stewart Parnell in December 1890, O'Brien joined the Anti-Parnellites.  In the 1892 general election he was opposed by a Unionist candidate but won by a margin of almost nine to one. Thereafter he was returned unopposed for North Tipperary until he retired at the general election of 1906 owing to failing eyesight.  He died on 10 January 1911.

He should not be confused with the better-known Pat O'Brien, who was M.P. for North Monaghan (1886–1892) and Kilkenny City (1895–1917).

Footnotes

Sources
Michael Stenton and Stephen Lees, Who’s Who of British Members of Parliament, Vol.2 1886–1918, Sussex, Harvester Press, 1978

The Times (London), 11 January 1911

Brian M. Walker (ed.), Parliamentary Election Results in Ireland, 1801-1922, Dublin, Royal Irish Academy, 1978

External links
 

1835 births
1911 deaths
Members of the Parliament of the United Kingdom for County Tipperary constituencies (1801–1922)
Politicians from County Tipperary
UK MPs 1885–1886
UK MPs 1886–1892
UK MPs 1892–1895
UK MPs 1895–1900
UK MPs 1900–1906
People from Nenagh
Anti-Parnellite MPs